James Daley may refer to:

James P. Daley, former American soldier
Jimmy Daley (born 1973), cricketer
Jim Daley, Canadian football coach
James Daly (mutineer) (died 1920), sometimes spelled Daley
James A. Daley, American ambassador

See also
James Daly (disambiguation)
Jimmy Dailey (1927–2002), Scottish footballer